Southridge Mall  is a regional shopping mall located in the Milwaukee County suburbs of Greendale and Greenfield, Wisconsin. At  it is Wisconsin's second largest mall behind Mayfair Mall in Wauwatosa, tied with Fox River Mall in Appleton. The mall's anchor stores are TJ Maxx, Dick's Sporting Goods, Golf Galaxy, Macy's, JCPenney, and Round 1 Entertainment. There are 2 vacant anchor stores that were once Boston Store and Kohl's. Sears closed in September 2017, Kohl's relocated to a mixed use development on September 29, 2018, and Boston Store closed in Summer 2018 as parent company Bon-Ton went out of business. The former Sears was replaced by Dick's Sporting Goods, Golf Galaxy, Round 1 Entertainment, and TJ Maxx.

History

Southridge opened in 1970 as the southern sister mall to Northridge Mall. Both malls were located on 76th Street, close to major east/west artery roads. Both were developed by Herb Kohl and Taubman Centers, Inc.

In 1988, the Kohl family sold its retail interests in Southridge and the mall was acquired by Western Development Corporation, a publicly traded real estate investment company specializing in regional malls. In 2020, the mall's ownership was transferred to its lender through a deed in lieu of foreclosure.

One of the mall's anchors was originally Gimbels. The store later became Marshall Field's, then H. C. Prange Co., which sold to Younkers. It was later subdivided among Cost Plus World Market, Steve & Barry's, and Linens 'n Things before the entire building became Macy's.

In 2015, Sears Holdings spun off 235 of its properties, including the Sears at Southridge Mall, into Seritage Growth Properties.

References

External links 
 Official site

Buildings and structures in Milwaukee County, Wisconsin
Shopping malls in Wisconsin
Tourist attractions in Milwaukee County, Wisconsin
Shopping malls established in 1970